= Unharwah railway station =

Railway station in Pakistan

Coordinates: 28.298015°N 68.902159°E

General information
- Owner: Ministry of Railways

Other information
- Station code: URW

History
- Former names: Great Indian Peninsula Railway
Location

Unharwah railway station (Urdu: انہاروه ریلوے اسٹیشن) is located in Pakistan.

== See also ==
- List of railway stations in Pakistan
- Pakistan Railways
